The 1978 World Cup took place November 30 – December 3 at the Makai Golf Club in Hanalei in Kauaʻi County, Hawaii. It was the 26th World Cup event. The tournament was a 72-hole stroke play team event with 48 teams. Each team consisted of two players from a country. The combined score of each team determined the team results. The United States team of John Mahaffey and Andy North won by ten strokes over the Australian team of Wayne Grady and Greg Norman. 

The individual competition for The International Trophy was won by Mahaffey two strokes ahead of North. Greg Norman and Thailand's Sukree Onsham tied for third.

Teams 

(a) denotes amateur

Scores
Team

International Trophy

Sources:

References

World Cup (men's golf)
Golf in Hawaii
World Cup golf
World Cup golf
World Cup golf
World Cup golf